Jacqueline Carey (born 1954 in Cambridge, Massachusetts) is an American novelist and short story writer. Carey grew up in Connecticut and graduated from Swarthmore College in 1977.  She lived in New York City for many years but published her first story in The New Yorker in 1986 after a move to Montana. In 2000, she wrote a mystery column for Salon.com. She now lives in New Jersey, with her husband, writer Ian Frazier.

Carey won a Guggenheim Fellowship in 1999 to write The Crossley Baby.

Books
Good Gossip (short stories, 1992)
The Other Family (novel, 1996)
Wedding Pictures (illustrated book, pictures by Kathy Osborn, 1997)
The Crossley Baby (novel, 2002)
It's A Crime (novel, 2008)

References

1954 births
Living people
20th-century American novelists
Swarthmore College alumni
21st-century American novelists
American women novelists
20th-century American women writers
21st-century American women writers
American women short story writers
20th-century American short story writers
21st-century American short story writers